Police Quest: In Pursuit of the Death Angel (also known as Police Quest I or simply Police Quest) is a 1987 police procedural adventure video game developed and published by Jim Walls and Sierra On-Line. Police Quest follows police officer Sonny Bonds as he investigates a drug cartel in the town of Lytton, California.

First released in 1987 as a command-line interface game built on Sierra's AGI, Police Quest was remade in 1992 using 256-color VGA graphics and the SCI engine and used point-and-click gameplay. Designed to effectively be a police simulator, Police Quest features relatively simple puzzles, but relies strongly on strict adherence to proper police procedure, as detailed in the game's manual.

Police Quest was a moderate critical and commercial success, spawning the successful Police Quest series, which later evolved into the SWAT series of shooter games. A direct sequel, Police Quest II: The Vengeance, was released in 1988.

Gameplay 
Police Quest: In Pursuit of The Death Angel, is an adventure game whose gameplay is centered on interacting with the environment to resolve a series of scenarios. These largely revolve around typical police work, such as securing crime scenes and recovering stolen vehicles, plus some important duty procedures. The original release of the game required the player to type in the desired actions, such as opening doors, pressing buttons, or firing one's gun, while the remake allows the player to use the mouse to select actions from a menu and objects in the environment.

The game is the most realistic of those developed by Sierra in the late 1980s (when compared to Leisure Suit Larry, King's Quest, or Space Quest). The lack of "traditional" puzzles made the game stand out at the time of release. Unlike many games of this genre, the style of play depends largely on a strict adherence to standard police policy and procedure. Proper policy must be followed and individual actions must be performed in order (e.g. Sonny must draw and aim his sidearm before firing, or he will shoot himself in the leg). Failure to abide by proper procedure typically leads to the player being penalized points, or having Sonny killed; for example, if Sonny does not store his gun in a gun locker while detaining a suspect at the jail, the suspect will immediately steal it and shoot him, resulting in a game over.

Plot 
In the mid-1980s (early 1990s in the remake), the city of Lytton, California experiences a rise in crime, most prominently drug abuse. Officer Sonny Bonds of the Lytton Police Department is assigned to traffic duty by his supervisor, Sergeant Dooley, and is told to look out for a stolen black Cadillac (Mercedes-Benz in the remake).

During his patrol, Bonds responds to a single-vehicle accident and finds the driver of the crashed car, drug dealer Lonny West, dead of a gunshot wound to the head. Bonds hands over the investigation to Sergeant Dooley and returns to patrol, ticketing a speeding motorist, handling some bikers who are troubling a restaurant, and arresting a drunk driver. After his shift ends, Bonds visits The Blue Room, a café frequented by off-duty police officers, where he talks with Officer Jack Cobb about Cobb's daughter Kathy, who is addicted to drugs. The next day, Bonds locates the stolen Cadillac/Mercedes-Benz (now painted light blue) and, with help from Cobb, arrests the driver, Jason Taselli. Bonds finds drugs in the trunk of the car and a .45 Smith & Wesson handgun on Taselli, linking him to West's murder.

Due to his work on the case, Bonds is promoted to detective, assigned to the Narcotics Division, and partnered with Detective Laura Watts. Investigating Lytton's drug epidemic, Bonds arrests Kathy's dealer Donald Colby, but learns from Cobb that Kathy has fallen into an overdose-induced coma with no chance of recovery. He also learns Taselli has escaped from jail, but patrol officers soon find him dead. Bonds identifies the cause of the drug crisis as Jessie Bains (Jesse Bains in the remake), nicknamed "The Death Angel", a drug lord who is involved in an illegal gambling operation at the Hotel Delphoria.

Bonds goes undercover to infiltrate the gambling ring at the Hotel Delphoria, enlisting the help of Marie Wilkans, a prostitute who was once his high school crush. He is taken to a card game with Bains, where he manages to gain Bains' trust. Bonds is taken to Bains' hotel room, where he calls the Narcotics Division for backup. Bains discovers Bonds' true identity, but before he can kill him, backup arrives and subdues Bains. Bains is arrested, tried, and convicted on multiple counts for a 97-year prison sentence, while Bonds is awarded the Key to the City for his work.

Development 

Prior to Police Quest's conception, Sierra president Ken Williams wanted to develop a police adventure game, preferably with an actual police officer overseeing the game's design to ensure authenticity and realism. In 1985, Williams met California Highway Patrol (CHP) officer Jim Walls, who was on administrative leave to treat trauma he had received from a shooting a year prior. Following Walls' retirement from the CHP in 1986, Williams befriended Walls and asked if he could write a short story about his experiences in the CHP; this short story eventually developed into Police Quest's plot.

Development commenced after Walls' story grew enough to be partitioned into a design document and game components for development. The game's designers were Williams, Walls, Roberta Williams, Mark Crowe, Scott Murphy, and Al Lowe. At the time, Walls was unfamiliar with computers, so the other Sierra developers assisted him until he could develop on his own. The game's protagonist, Sonny Bonds, was loosely based on Walls' son (also named Sonny), and many incidents in the game were based on actual incidents encountered by Walls during his time in the CHP.

Police Quest was released for the IBM PC, Apple II (128K), Amiga, Atari ST, and Apple IIGS. An SCI 1.1 enhanced version in 256-color VGA was released in 1992.

Reception 
The first four Police Quest games totaled 850,000 sales by late 1995. However, Markus Krichel of PC Games noted that "interest on the part of the gamer fell slightly" with Police Quest: Open Season, which led Sierra On-Line to experiment with a new direction for the series with Police Quest: SWAT. According to Sierra, combined sales of the Police Quest series—including SWAT—surpassed 1.2 million units by the end of March 1996.

Computer Gaming World recommended Police Quest, praising some of the graphics as "the most terrific this reviewer has ever seen". Antic said of the ST version that because of the realism and need to follow procedures "there is a strong sense of actually becoming the cop on the beat". Macworld was less positive, stating that the game "plays like a long version of a routine cop TV show, and you can't lose if you just follow the manual. The game begs for a challenging mystery".

Police Quest I was reported to have been used as a training tool for police officers:

References

External links 
 

1987 video games
1992 video games
1980s interactive fiction
Adventure games
Amiga games
Apple II games
Apple IIGS games
Atari ST games
DOS games
Games commercially released with DOSBox
Police Quest and SWAT
ScummVM-supported games
Sierra Entertainment games
Video games about police officers
Video games set in 1992
Video games set in the 1980s
Video games set in California
Video games developed in the United States